New Year's Revolution is the only studio album by American rock band Project Rocket, the follow-up to their split EP with Fall Out Boy. It is their only album as they broke up shortly after, and band member Andy Hurley joined Fall Out Boy right before their release of Take This to Your Grave.

Track listing
"Draw Me Closer" – 3:19
"True Til College" – 3:23
"The Pen and Paper Cliche" – 2:19
"Peoples History of Us" – 5:25
"You Charlatan" – 3:04
"Send in the Replicas" – 3:08
"With Stars in Her Eyes" – 3:06
"Slow Motion Suicide" – 2:52
"Andy's Song" – 3:55
"Drink Yourself to Sleep" – 3:38
"A New Year's Revolution" – 8:25

Trivia
"You Charlatan" was originally included on their split EP with Fall Out Boy, Project Rocket / Fall Out Boy.
"Andy's Song" is written and performed by the drummer, Andy Hurley.

Credits
T.J. Minich: Bass, vocals
Noah Nickel: Bass, clapping
Andrew Hurley:	Percussion, animation, clapping, vocals
Kyle Johnson: Bass, clapping, guitar

2003 debut albums
Project Rocket albums